was an admiral in the Imperial Japanese Navy during World War II.

Biography
Takagi was a native of Iwaki city, Fukushima prefecture. He was a graduate of the 39th class of the Imperial Japanese Naval Academy, ranking 17th of 148 cadets in 1911. As a midshipman, he served on the cruiser  and battleship , and after his commissioning as ensign, on the cruiser  and battleship .

As a lieutenant, he served on submarine , and following advanced coursework in navigation and in torpedo warfare, he became executive officer and then captain of the submarine . He was promoted to commander in 1928, and held a number of staff positions. He was sent to the United States and Europe in 1931, and promoted to captain in 1932.

Takagi was promoted to rear admiral on 15 November 1938, and was Chief of the 2nd Section of the Imperial Japanese Navy General Staff in 1939.

At the start of the Pacific War, Takagi was commanding the naval forces supporting the invasion of the Philippine Islands in late 1941, Takagi headed the task force covering the Java landings in Dutch East Indies. He was senior Japanese commander in the Battle of the Java Sea, sinking two cruisers and three destroyers in exchange for damage to a single Japanese destroyer.

Takagi was promoted to vice admiral on 1 May 1942. He was commander of the carrier task force ( and ) in "Operation Mo". Thus he was also senior Japanese commander at the Battle of the Coral Sea. He commanded the 5th Cruiser Division during the Battle of Midway.

In November 1942, Takagi was reassigned to be commander of the Mako Guard District. In April 1943, The Guard District moved to Takao, Taiwan and Takagi was assigned to be commander of the renamed Takao Guard District. On 21 June 1943, he was again given a front line assignment, when he was made commander of the IJN 6th Fleet (submarines), based in the Mariana Islands.

Takagi was killed in action during the Battle of Saipan in 1944. Missing after the battle, it is not clear whether he committed suicide or died trying to escape in a submarine. He was posthumously promoted to full admiral.

References

Books
Fuller, Richard. "Hirohito's Samurai. Leaders of the Japanese Armed Forces, 1926-1945." Arms and Armour Press (1991).

 - Firsthand account of the battle by the captain of the Japanese destroyer Amatsukaze.

 — 135 minute documentary of the battle. Won the "Golden Calf" award for "Best Long Documentary" at the 1996 Nederlands Film Festival.

External links

 - Translation of the official record by the Japanese Demobilization Bureaux detailing the Imperial Japanese Army and Navy's participation in the Southwest Pacific area of the Pacific War.
Breaching the Marianas: The Battle for Saipan (Marines in World War II Commemorative Series)

Notes

1892 births
1944 deaths
Military personnel from Fukushima Prefecture
Japanese admirals of World War II
Imperial Japanese Navy admirals
Japanese military personnel killed in World War II
Battle of Midway